Van Egmond or Van Egmont is Dutch toponymic surname meaning "from/of Egmond", a town in North Holland. Before 1811, the spelling of the name with a "d" or "t" was interchangeable. It can refer to any of the members of the House of Egmond (<1000–1682), of which better known members include:

Anna van Egmond (1533–1558), first wife of William the Silent, Prince of Orange
Anna van Egmont the Elder (1504–1574), daughter of Floris, mother of executed counts Horn and Montigny 
Arnold van Egmond (1410–1473), Duke of Guelders
Floris van Egmond (ca.1470–1539), Stadtholder of Guelders
Frederik van Egmond (ca.1440–1521), councilor of Charles the Bold en Maximilian I
George van Egmond (ca.1504-1559), Christian religious authority and bishop of Utrecht
Jan III van Egmond (1438–1516), first Count of Egmont, Stadtholder of Holland, Zeeland and West-Friesland
Karel van Egmond (1467–1538), Duke of Guelders
Lamoraal van Egmont (1522–1568), Dutch general and statesman, beheaded by Phillip II on charges of heresy
Maximiliaan van Egmond (1509–1548), Stadtholder of Friesland 
Philip van Egmont (1558–1590), fifth Count of Egmont, son of Lamoraal
Willem van Egmond (1412–1483), Stadtholder of Guelders

Other people with the surname, some of whom may be descendants of the noble family, include:
Ab van Egmond (born 1938), Dutch racing cyclist
Annet van Egmond (born 1964), Dutch designer
Anthony Van Egmond (1778-1838), Dutch soldier and early settler in southwestern Ontario, Canada
Derk van Egmond (born 1956), Dutch track cyclist.
Emily van Egmond (born 1993), Australian football player
Gary van Egmond (born 1965), Australian football player and manager
Joshua van Egmond (born 1986), Australian weightlifter and Strategy Consultant
Jacobus van Egmond (1908-1969), Dutch racing cyclist
Jordy van Egmond (born 1992), Dutch DJ and music producer known as Dyro
Justus van Egmont (1602–1674), Dutch painter and a tapestry designer in Antwerp
Max van Egmond (born 1936), Dutch bass and baritone singer
Tim Van Egmond (born 1969), American baseball player
William Gysbert Van Egmond (1883-1949), Canadian architect

See also
Adalbert of Egmond (died c. 710 in Egmond), Anglo-Saxon missionary in Holland and Frisia

References

Dutch-language surnames
Surnames of Dutch origin
Toponymic surnames